The 2015 European Darts Matchplay  was the eighth of nine PDC European Tour events on the 2015 PDC Pro Tour. The tournament took place at the Olympiahalle in Innsbruck, Austria between 18–20 September 2015. It featured a field of 48 players and £115,000 in prize money, with £25,000 going to the winner.

Michael van Gerwen won the tournament, defeating Dave Chisnall 6–4 in the final.

Prize money
The prize fund was increased to £115,000 after being £100,000 for the previous two years.

Qualification and format
The top 16 players from the PDC ProTour Order of Merit on 30 June 2015 automatically qualified for the event. The remaining 32 places went to players from three qualifying events - 20 from the UK Qualifier (held in Wigan on 3 July), eight from the European Qualifier (held in Mülheim on 10 September at the same time as the European Darts Trophy) and four from the Host Nation Qualifier (held at the venue the day before the event started), although following the withdrawals of Gary Anderson and Kyle Anderson, the host nation were given an extra two qualifying spots, bringing the total up to six.

The following players took part in the tournament:

Top 16
  Michael van Gerwen (winner)
  Michael Smith (second round)
  Peter Wright (quarter-finals)
  Ian White (third round)
  Brendan Dolan (third round)
  Dave Chisnall (runner-up)
  Justin Pipe (third round)
  Mervyn King (third round)
  Simon Whitlock (second round)
  Kim Huybrechts (quarter-finals)
  Terry Jenkins (third round)
  Robert Thornton (semi-finals)
  Vincent van der Voort (quarter-finals)
  Benito van de Pas (third round)
  Jelle Klaasen (second round)
  Stephen Bunting (second round)

UK Qualifier 
  Alan Norris (third round)
  Jamie Caven (first round)
  Gerwyn Price (first round)
  Adam Hunt (first round)
  Terry Temple (first round)
  William O'Connor (second round)
  Darren Johnson (second round)
  Andy Hamilton (second round)
  Joe Murnan (first round)
  Paul Milford (first round)
  Dean Winstanley (first round)
  Mark Walsh (second round)
  Kevin Painter (second round)
  Darren Webster (second round)
  Mickey Mansell (second round)
  Tony Newell (second round)
  Wes Newton (first round)
  David Pallett (semi-finals)

European Qualifier
  Maik Langendorf (second round)
  Stefan Stoyke (first round)
  Dirk van Duijvenbode (first round)
  Ronny Huybrechts (second round)
  Dimitri Van den Bergh (second round)
  Raymond van Barneveld (third round)
  Robert Marijanović (second round)
  Max Hopp (first round)

Host Nation Qualifier
  Roxy-James Rodriguez (first round)
  Armin Glanzer (first round)
  Aaron Hardy (first round)
  Mensur Suljović (first round)
  Zoran Lerchbacher (first round)
  Rowby-John Rodriguez (quarter-finals)

Draw

References

2015 PDC European Tour
2015 in Austrian sport